George H. and Loretta Ward House, also known as the Cline House, is an historic residence located in West Liberty, Iowa, United States.  It has been listed on the National Register of Historic Places since 1997.

History
George Ward was a native of Pittsburgh, Pennsylvania and Loretta was from the West Liberty-West Branch, Iowa area.  They originally settled on a farm near Centerdale, Iowa before moving to West Liberty in 1890.  Local contractor Will A. Warren built this house in 1896.  The Wards owned one of the first automobiles in town and hired Frank Pertlick as a chauffeur and gardener.  George died in 1905 and Loretta in 1919.  The house and property was bequeathed to Pertlick, but it was tied up in probate for years.  His lawyer, J.E. McIntosh, took the property as payment.

Architecture 
The Ward House is a 2½ story, frame structure executed in the Queen Anne style. The main block measures  and the summer kitchen adds another .  The primary decorative feature on the exterior is a wrap-around porch. It is highlighted by a corner turret capped with a finial, and it is enclosed with a balustrade. The asymmetrical facade has a second story porch above the main floor porch with a distinctive balustrade. The main block of the house is capped with a hip roof.  The cross gables feature metal crests along the top. A barn on the property that housed the carriage and horses was replaced by a smaller garage at some point.

References

Houses completed in 1896
Queen Anne architecture in Iowa
Houses in Muscatine County, Iowa
National Register of Historic Places in Muscatine County, Iowa
Houses on the National Register of Historic Places in Iowa